Ferrocarrils de la Generalitat Valenciana ("Valencian Government Railways") or FGV is a Valencian public railway company which operates several  lines, in the autonomous community of Valencia, Spain.

The company currently operates the city metro and tram system of Valencia (Valencia Metro) and Alicante (Alicante Tram).

The company is owned by the Generalitat Valenciana (i.e. the regional government body of the Valencian Community).

History

Establishment of FGV 
FGV was founded as a company in 1986, and on 1 January 1987 took over all remaining narrow gauge railways in the Valencian Community. These had previously been part of the nationally owned FEVE system.

The newly formed railway system consisted of various electrified suburban lines around Valencia and the diesel-worked Alicante to Denia railway. Much of the infrastructure was in a poor state following years of neglect by the FEVE administration and patronage was consequently low.

Investment in the Valencia system 
The early years of FGV saw much investment in the Valencia suburban system. The lines to the north and south of the city were connected by cross-town tunnels which were developed into the current metro system. FGV also introduced the first modern tram in Spain, partly running on the alignment of narrow gauge railways.

Both the metro and trams systems are being developed through the addition of new lines. Projects are also in hand to modernise the classic parts of the system through realignments and new rolling stock.

Investment in the Alicante system 

In Alicante too, the narrow gauge railway is being developed into a modern tramway. It has been extended through a tunnel to Mercado and will ultimately reach the RENFE railway station through an extension of this tunnel. The tram system is also being extended in other directions.

The Alicante to Dénia railway line is being electrified as far as Benidorm and will be served by tram-trains (vehicles that can run on both railway and tramway infrastructure). The remaining section to Denia will continue to be diesel-worked for the time being and trainsets have been modernised for this purpose.

In Benidorm, a local tram service is also being planned. This will branch off the main railway line and serve the centre of this town.

Future projects 
FGV is seeking to take over the Xàtiva to Alcoi railway from Renfe. The mountain railway is currently in a poor state and served only by three trains per day and direction. The company also provided assessment to the city of Rosario in Argentina for its future Rosario Tramway, a project which is largely based on the Valencia system.

Rolling stock

In use

Former rolling stock

References

External links 
 

Railway companies of Spain
Rail transport in Valencia
Rail transport in the Valencian Community
Metre gauge railways in Spain